The Skatepark of Tampa is a skatepark in Tampa, Florida, United States. It is considered one of the top skateboarding venues on the East Coast of the United States. The name is often abbreviated as SPoT, and it is well known for its annual Tampa Am and Tampa Pro competitions.

History 
On December 28, 1992, SPoT was opened only to employees, and on January 2, 1993 the park officially opened to the public. The first pro contest was held April 1 & 2, 1995 and won by Mike Vallely.

On April 1, 2012, SPoT announced on its website that the park had been purchased (for 9.3 million) by rapper Lil Wayne. It was revealed shortly afterwards that the fake press release was an April Fool's joke.

Obstacles 

The skatepark includes a terrain park-style "pro course", offering a pyramid, rails and transitions. Outside, there is a concrete transition course with a pizza oven. The "beginner's course" features many smaller rails and ramps to expand skateboarding skills and also includes the famous bowl.

The street skateboarding course is redesigned every year for the Tampa Pro and Tampa Am contest.

Team

Skateboarding
Pro: 
Gavin Overstreet
Elissa Steamer
Jeff Lenoce
Matt Milligan
Mike Frazier
Clive Dixon
Jimmy Marcus aka "The Greek"
Mike Frazier
Brian Schaefer(owner)
Paul Zitzer
Tyson Peterson
Zion Wright

Am: 
Abdias Rivera
Sam Bellipanni
Eric McKenney
Markus Jalaber
James Cobb
Wes Box
Cash Gaddes
Robby Kirkland
Treshan O'Shaugnessy
Alejandro Burnell
Alex Johnson
Allen Russell
Pat Stiener
Marse Farmer

Party
Adam Dyet
Allen Russell
Braydon Szafranski
Brian Schaefer
Chris Peck
David Gravette
Don Brown
DJ Wade
Bart Simpson
Marty McFly
Joey Brezinski
Justin Strubing
Lizard King
Matt Milligan
Oliver Flores
Omar Hassan
Pat Duffy
P-Stone
Cory Kennedy
Keenan Milton
Ali Boulala
Shane Cross

Family
Brian Howard
Brian Sloane
Corey Hainline
Dorian Tucker
Jay Giroux
Josh Stewart
Kyle Berard
Mike Peterson
Paul Zitzer
Ryan Dodge
Scotty Conley
Steve Brandi

BMX
Spencer Foresman
Mark Mulville
Matt Coplon
Luis (aka Project Pap) Pinzon
Jeff Harrington
Sean Albright

Business
Chris Kneer
George Lackey
Henry Alva
Jimmy Hurn
Michael J. Buscemi 
Wesley Cowan

Pro Contest Results 
Tampa Pro 1995

April 1 & 2

Vert:

 Danny Way
 Tap Pappas
 Tony Hawk
 Colin Mckay
 Mike Crum
 Neal Hendrix
 Tom Boyle
 Omar Hassan
 Andy Macdonald
 Remy Stratton

Street:

 Mike Vallely
 Danny Way
 Steve Berra
 Wade Speyer
 Chet Thomas
 Caine Gayle
 Moses Itkonen
 Chris Senn
 Dave Duren
 John Montessi

Street champions

1996 - Mike Vallely, N.J.
1997 - Johhny Davidson, Atl, Ga. 1998 - Omar Hassan, Benson, Ca.
1999 - Wade Speyer, Omaha, Nb.
2000 - Andy McDonald, Sunny Vale, Ca.
2001 - Chet Thomas, Cali
2002 - Chris Senn, oakland, Ca.

Music venue 
The skatepark also doubles as a popular music venue. In 2012, SPoT hosted its 20-year anniversary event with performances from Souls of Mischief and Killer Mike.

The venue also hosts the Transitions Art Gallery music venue on its premises. TAG has served as a springboard for acoustic artists and other musicians. In December 2012, the owner of the Gallery announced he was stepping down and that the venue would be under new management from January 2013. The venue's new owners subsequently announced that the name of the venue would change to Epic Problem. Epic Problem hosts many shows from many post-hardcore bands and one annual show from the nonprofit high school (mainly from Hillsborough High School) sketch comedy troupe On The Brink.

In July 2016, Epic Problem held its last show and passed the torch to King State coffee, owned by Tim McTague, of Underoath and Nate Young, of Anberlin, who use the space for brewing.

In March 2017, the SPoT Snack Bar was expanded and reconstructed into a full-fledged music venue and renamed "Transitions". It is complete with stage, lighting, sound system and newly rebuilt bar. Transitions held its first show during the 23rd Annual Tampa Pro contest that featured the music of Ray Barbee, Drowning Clowns, Arctic, and Tampa's own Samurai Shotgun.

Popular culture
The skatepark is a major feature in the Tony Hawk's Underground video game, and SPoT employees appear as competitors in the street and vertical contests. The skatepark also served as an exclusive competition level in Tony Hawk's Pro Skater 2x.

SPoT appeared on the MTV series Rob & Big that featured professional skateboarder and entrepreneur Rob Dyrdek.

In August 2011, Lil Wayne stopped by SPoT for a private after hours session. He has attended every Tampa Pro contest since, often spectating from the judges' booth.

In May 2004, comedian Dave Chappelle set up an after hours session with some of his friends while on tour in Tampa.

References

External links 

Buildings and structures in Tampa, Florida
Sports venues in Tampa, Florida
Tourist attractions in Tampa, Florida
Tampa
1992 establishments in Florida
Sports venues completed in 1992